Beyond the Mountains and Hills is a 2016 Israeli drama film directed by Eran Kolirin. It was screened in the Un Certain Regard section at the 2016 Cannes Film Festival. It was one of five films nominated for the Best Film Award at the Ophir Awards.

References

External links
 

2016 films
2016 drama films
Israeli drama films
2010s Hebrew-language films
Films directed by Eran Kolirin